Potanthus omaha, commonly known as the lesser dart, is a species of skipper butterflies. It is found in Australia, Indochina, Malaysia, Singapore, the Philippines,  India  and Sulawesi. It includes the following subspecies:

Potanthus omaha bione Evans, 1949 - endemic to Mindanao, Philippines
Potanthus omaha copia (Evans, 1932)
Potanthus omaha omaha (H. Edwards, 1863)
Potanthus omaha maesina (Evans, 1934) - occurs mainly in Borneo but also found in the Tawi-tawi, Philippines
Potanthus omaha nita (Evans, 1934) - found in Sulawesi, Indonesia; possibly conspecific to P. o. bione.

References

Potanthus
Butterflies described in 1863
Butterflies of Singapore
Butterflies of Indochina